Elections to Ballymena Borough Council were held on 21 May 1997 on the same day as the other Northern Irish local government elections. The election used four district electoral areas to elect a total of 24 councillors.

Election results

Note: "Votes" are the first preference votes.

Districts summary

|- class="unsortable" align="centre"
!rowspan=2 align="left"|Ward
! % 
!Cllrs
! % 
!Cllrs
! %
!Cllrs
! %
!Cllrs
! %
!Cllrs
!rowspan=2|TotalCllrs
|- class="unsortable" align="center"
!colspan=2 bgcolor="" | UUP
!colspan=2 bgcolor="" | DUP
!colspan=2 bgcolor="" | SDLP
!colspan=2 bgcolor="" | Alliance
!colspan=2 bgcolor="white"| Others
|-
|align="left"|Ballymena North
|bgcolor="40BFF5"|36.8
|bgcolor="40BFF5"|3
|22.0
|1
|16.8
|1
|7.8
|1
|16.6
|1
|7
|-
|align="left"|Ballymena South
|36.6
|3
|bgcolor="#D46A4C"|40.9
|bgcolor="#D46A4C"|3
|17.6
|1
|0.0
|0
|4.9
|0
|7
|-
|align="left"|Bannside
|32.9
|2
|bgcolor="#D46A4C"|50.7
|bgcolor="#D46A4C"|3
|16.4
|0
|0.0
|0
|0.0
|0
|5
|-
|align="left"|Braid
|bgcolor="40BFF5"|47.7
|bgcolor="40BFF5"|3
|32.7
|1
|19.6
|1
|0.0
|0
|0.0
|0
|5
|-
|- class="unsortable" class="sortbottom" style="background:#C9C9C9"
|align="left"| Total
|38.3
|11
|36.7
|8
|17.5
|3
|2.0
|1
|5.5
|1
|24
|-
|}

Districts results

Ballymena North

1993: 3 x UUP, 1 x DUP, 1 x SDLP, 1 x Alliance, 1 x Independent Unionist
1997: 3 x UUP, 1 x DUP, 1 x SDLP, 1 x Alliance, 1 x Independent Unionist
1993-1997 Change: No change

Ballymena South

1993: 3 x DUP, 2 x UUP, 1 x SDLP, 1 x Independent Unionist
1997: 3 x DUP, 3 x UUP, 1 x SDLP
1993-1997 Change: UUP gain from Independent Unionist

Bannside

1993: 3 x DUP, 2 x UUP
1997: 3 x DUP, 2 x UUP
1993-1997 Change: No change

Braid

1993: 3 x UUP, 2 x DUP
1997: 3 x UUP, 1 x DUP, 1 x SDLP
1993-1997 Change: DUP gain from UUP

References

Ballymena Borough Council elections
Ballymena